The Ministry of Borders and Tribal Affairs, is an organ of the Central Government of Afghanistan.

List

External links
Official site

References

Frontiers, Nations and Tribal Affairs